The Albert J. Castronovo Esprit de Corps Award is a special award presented at the Bands of America Grand National Competition. All bands participating in the Grand Nationals are eligible to receive the award regardless of their scores in the competition. The group that most exhibits pride, spirit, enthusiasm, friendliness, camaraderie, and unity of purpose for the marching band activity is selected to receive the award.

History

The Esprit de Corps Award was first awarded in 1978. It was later renamed the "Al Castronovo Esprit de Corps Award" in 1987 after his death. Since then, one band has received the award at each year's Grand National Championship competition except for 1993 and 2012, when two groups tied and both were presented with the award. The BOA staff, Grand National event staff, and volunteers are asked to nominate a band to receive the award. The BOA executive staff reviews nominees and makes the final selection. In 2016, the family of Al Castronovo was also involved in selecting the winning group, Vista Murrieta, and presenting the award.

Albert J. Castronovo
Albert J. Castronovo (1937 - 1986) was a nationally acclaimed bandleader, choreographer, educator and administrator. He was recognized as a pioneer in using amplification and special effects for marching bands. He was also considered an authority in the use of computers for music education, being one of the first to design marching band shows using a computer and plotter. During a teaching career of 25 years, his bands, choirs, orchestras, and jazz bands received 25 consecutive superior ratings at Indiana State Competitions. His marching band at Chesterton High School won seven state championships, four national competitions including the 1981 Marching Bands of America Grand National Championship, and was selected as one of 10 bands to march in President Ronald Reagan’s 1981 Inaugural Parade. He sat on the Bands of America advisory board and was a well-loved teacher by his colleagues and students, alike. He was an inspirational teacher whose ideals embodied the spirit of the Bands of America’s mission to create and provide positive, life-changing experiences through music. The award was named in his honor after his death in 1986.

Al Castronovo Esprit de Corps Award winners

References 

American music awards